The Moonstone is a British mystery television series adapted from the 1868 novel The Moonstone by Wilkie Collins. It aired on BBC 1 in five episodes between 16 January and 13 February 1972.

Cast
 Vivien Heilbron as Rachel Verinder 
 Robin Ellis as Franklin Blake
 Kathleen Byron as Lady Verinder
 Basil Dignam as Gabriel Betteredge
 Martin Jarvis as Godfrey Ablewhite
 Anna Cropper as Rosanna Spearman
 John Welsh as Sergeant Cuff
 Peter Sallis as Mr. Bruff
 Christopher Hancock as Ezra Jennings
 Brian Murphy as Septimus Luker
 Maureen Morris as Penelope Betteredge
 Madhav Sharma as Indian
 Bell McCallum as  Nancy
 Michael Gover as Superintendent Seegrave
 Philip Ray as Dr. Candy
 Roy Macready as Tomlinson
 Tony Maiden as Conjuror's Boy
 Ali Baba as Indian Conjuror
 Azad Ali as Indian Conjuror
 Cynthia Etherington as Miss Clack
 Brian Badcoe as Mr. Murthwaite
 Douglas Mann as Gooseberry
 Dona Martin as Lucy Yolland
 Sheila Keith as Mrs. Yolland
 Norman Claridge as Dr. Richardson
 Timothy Craven as Chemist
 Colin Baker as John Herncastle
 Reginald Jessup as Purser
 Norman Mitchell as Mr. Ablewhite
 Mary Barclay as Mrs. Ablewhite
 Billy Cornelius as Landlord
 Stephen Rea as Major Frayne
 Derek Chafer as Sergeant
 Julie May as Cuff's Housekeeper
 David Simeon as Mechanic
 Pat Gorman as Baker, Plain Clothes Man
 Albert Moses as Treasury Guard
 Marguerite Young as Mrs. Threadgall
 Sherrie Hewson as Charity Ablewhite
 Georgina Simpson as  Grace Ablewhite

References

Bibliography
Baskin, Ellen. Serials on British Television, 1950-1994. Scolar Press, 1996.

External links
 

BBC television dramas
1972 British television series debuts
1972 British television series endings
1970s British drama television series
1970s British television miniseries
English-language television shows
Television shows based on British novels